The Kinshasa Democratic Republic of the Congo Temple is a temple of the Church of Jesus Christ of Latter-day Saints (LDS Church) in Kinshasa, Democratic Republic of the Congo. The intent to construct the temple was announced by church president Thomas S. Monson on 1 October 2011.

History
The temple was announced concurrently with the Barranquilla Colombia, Durban South Africa, Star Valley Wyoming, and Provo City Center temples. When announced, this increased the total number of temples worldwide to 166.

A groundbreaking ceremony, to signify the beginning of construction, took place on 12 February 2016, with Neil L. Andersen presiding. A public open house was held in March 2019. The lead negotiator for the temple, both with the government and with local subcontractors, was Norman Kamosi, a former Air Congo executive and member of the Congolese Parliament.  Kamosi joined the LDS Church in Washington, D.C., after having fled there when Kabile came to power.

Following the public open house, the temple was dedicated on 14 April 2019 by Dale G. Renlund, with the dedicatory prayer given in French, and is the fourth operating temple in Africa.

The temple is a single-story building with a concrete and fill structure and a steel superstructure. Unlike most of the church's other temples, the building is not topped with a statue of the angel Moroni, although the building is designed to support one if added later. The temple is built on a 10-acre site that it shares with other existing buildings owned by the LDS Church, including a meetinghouse and an institute building, the latter also being used for seminary classes.

See also

 List of temples of The Church of Jesus Christ of Latter-day Saints
 List of temples of The Church of Jesus Christ of Latter-day Saints by geographic region
 Comparison of temples of The Church of Jesus Christ of Latter-day Saints
 Temple architecture (Latter-day Saints)
 The Church of Jesus Christ of Latter-day Saints in the Democratic Republic of the Congo

References

External links
Kinshasa Democratic Republic of the Congo Temple Official site
Kinshasa Democratic Republic of the Congo Temple at ChurchofJesusChristTemples.org

21st-century Latter Day Saint temples
Buildings and structures in Kinshasa
Religious buildings and structures in the Democratic Republic of the Congo
Temples (LDS Church) in Africa
Temples (LDS Church) completed in 2019